Sultan (Ottoman Turkish:سلطان) and Hatun (Mongolian: ᠬᠠᠲᠤᠨ хатан; Old Turkic: 𐰴𐰍𐰣, romanized: katun; Ottoman Turkish: خاتون, romanized: hatun or قادین romanized: kadın; Persian: خاتون khātūn; Chinese: 可敦; Hindi: ख़ातून khātūn) are the two female titles that were used for Ottoman princesses, daughters of Ottoman sultans.

Title and treatment

Titles 
For the daughters of a sovereign Sultan or a daughter of a son of a sultan the titles that were used are:

 Lady (hatun, خاتون). Used before 16th century and also used for sultan's mothers and consorts.
 Format style: "(given name) Hatun", i.e. Lady (given name)
 Sultana (sultan, سلطان). Used after 16th century. Formal title:
 Short: "(given name) Sultana", i.e. Sultana (given name), with the style of sultanım (my sultan(a)) or efendim (my mistress).
 Full: Devletlû İsmetlu (given name) Sultân Aliyyetü'ş-Şân Hazretleri

For the sons and daughter of sultana the titles that were used are:

For a sons:

 Prince Sultan (sultanzade, سلطانزاده). Sons of sultanas (imperial princes).
 Formal title: "Sultanzade (given name) Bey-Efendi", i.e. Sir Prince Sultan (given name)

For a daughter:

 Sultana madam (hanımsultan, خانم سلطان). Daughters of sultanas (imperial princesses).
 Formal title: "(given name) Hanımsultan", i.e. Sultana madam (given name)

Treatments 

Before the 16th century, Ottoman imperial princesses and consorts of the Sultan held the same title after their given name, hatun, the Turkish form of the Mongolian title khatun (the feminine equivalent of khan). By the beginning of the 16th century, Ottoman princesses held the title of sultan after their given name, titles that were also held by other prominent members of the Ottoman imperial family: the emperor (together with khan), princes (together with title şehzade), the emperor's legal mother (together with title valide), the chief consort of the emperor (together with title haseki), the daughters of princesses (together with title hanım), and the sons of princesses (together with Persian patronymic suffix -zāde). This usage underlines the Ottoman conception of sovereign power as family prerogative.

The formal way of addressing an Ottoman princess is Devletlû İsmetlu (given name) Sultân Aliyyetü'ş-Şân Hazretleri, i.e., Sultana (given name). The title of sons of princesses are sultanzade and daughters of princesses are hanimsultan. The title of the consorts of princesses are called damat, the princess also had the right never to consummate the marriage this is because they were often married even very young and sometimes even with older men. Sultana, a title which usually referred to female sultans relative to Westerners, does not exist in the Ottoman language. Nevertheless, westerners often translated their official title, sultan, to sultana, possibly to distinguish them from the Ottoman sovereign.

Example of imperial princesses (sultans) 

 Mihrimah Sultan (21 March 1522 – 25 January 1578), daughter of Suleiman the Magnificent. She was the most powerful imperial princess in Ottoman history and one of the prominent figures during the Sultanate of Women. Her ability and power, and her running of the affairs of the harem in the same manner as the sultan's mother, resulted in Mihrimah being referred to as Valide Sultan for Selim II, although she was not called by this title on any historical record.
 Fatma Sultan (1605/1606 – after 1667), daughter of Ahmed I. She was known for her many political marriages.
 Ayşe Sultan  (2 November 1887 – 10 August 1960), daughter of Abdülhamid II. She was known for publishing her memoirs by the name of Babam Sultan Abdülhamid in 1960.
 Ayşe Gülnev Sultan (born 17 January 1971), great-great-great-granddaughter of Murad V. She is a director of property investment and development companies, and writes and researches historical pieces on Ottoman history.

Daughters of the Ottoman sultans
This is a list of Ottoman princesses, the daughters of the monarchs of the Ottoman Empire who ruled over the transcontinental empire from its inception in 1299 to its dissolution in 1922.

Other Ottoman princesses

Daughters of Ottoman princes
When a prince (şehzade) gave birth to a girl, she took the title of sultana (sultan). These little girls, unlike the sons of a prince who succeeded in ascending the throne, were not killed when their father did not become sultan, this is because they could never aspire to the throne.

Daughters of Ottoman princesses
When a sultana gave birth to a daughter, she received the title of hanimsultan (Sultana madam).

References

Sources

 
 
 

Ottoman princesses
 
Lists of princesses